Gaspereau Vineyards is a small winery located in the Gaspereau River Valley of Nova Scotia run by Gina Haverstock. The vineyard encompasses  and is 3 kilometres from downtown Wolfville. It is one of several wineries in Nova Scotia. The winery produces a number of red and white wines, available in dry, off dry, and semi dry. Additionally, icewine and maple wine are made. In 2020 they won a Lieutenant Governor's Award for Excellence in Nova Scotia Wines.

History
Once the site of an apple orchard & cattle farm, the vineyard was planted in 1996 by Hans Jost of Jost Vineyards. It opened to the public in 2004.

References

External links
Gaspereau Vineyards

Companies based in Nova Scotia
Wineries of Canada
Alcohol in Nova Scotia